Borneo Company Limited, formed in 1856, was one of the oldest companies based in East Malaysia (Sarawak and Sabah).

History

Brooke era
The Borneo Company Limited (BCL) was registered in London in June 1856 with a capital of £60,000 and office at 25 Mincing Lane. Its directors, including some close associates of White Rajah James Brooke, were Robert Henderson (of R.& J.Henderson, Glasgow merchants), John Charles Templer (friend of James Brooke), James Dyce Nicol, John Smith, Francis Richardson, and John Harvey (the latter two of MacEwan & Co. in Singapore). The Hendersons had been early backers of the Eastern Archipelago Company but pulled out before its incorporation. The commercial hub of the company was, however, in Singapore, and businesses were soon also opened in Thailand, and then Indonesia and Hong Kong., not to mention a jute mill at Baranagore near Calcutta which was very profitable until spun off as Baranagore Jute Factories Limited in 1872.

In Sarawak, its first manager was a Dane, Ludvig Verner Helms, who had been trading there on his own account since 1852. The company was given the mandate to "take over and work Mines, Ores, Veins or Seams of all descriptions of Minerals in the Island of Borneo, and to barter or sell the produce of such workings" at the cost of royalty payments to the Sarawak government treasury in a 1857 agreement. Sago was an early staple of its trade (with a factory in Kuching), but mining, initially of antimony around Bau, then coal at Simunjan, mercury at Tegora and later of gold in Bau, took priority. The Rajahs had an ambivalent relationship with the Company, but often relied on it to assist them - not least when its ship helped relieve the town from the Chinese uprising of 1857 - and it printed government currency, while expanded its business to insurance, brokerage, travel, and shipping. In 1923, there was no longer any economic benefit of extracting minerals in Sarawak. The Borneo Company in London was then forced to relinquish its 1857 agreement.

Initially, all the BCL managers and senior employees were European. Only in the 1950s, were local Sarawakians appointed as executives and managers. The company also had branches throughout Sarawak, Sabah, and Brunei.

British Crown Colony
After World War II ended in 1945, the company was the only agent to distribute oil from Shell Oil Company, operating the first Shell petrol kiosk in Kuching. The Sarawak colonial government also mandated the company to import and distribute consumer goods throughout Sarawak.

The Borneo Company offices in Kuching were on the spot now occupied by the Hilton hotel, with the manager's house, 'Aneberg', on the hill above. It also had warehouses located where Grand Margherita and Wisma Bukit Mata today.

Federation of Malaysia
In 1967, the company merged with the Inchcape Group headquartered in Singapore. In 1974, the Borneo Company initiated a joint venture with Sarawak Economic Development Corporation (SEDC) to form Sarawak Sebor Sdn Bhd. In 2007, Sarawak Sebor sold all its shareholdings to a company known as IDS/LF Asia. LF (Lee & Fung) Asia was a global supply chain company headquartered in Hong Kong. In 2016, LF Asia sold its interests to another China based company known as DCH (Dah Chong Hong Holdings Ltd). On 28 September 2018, DCH decided to cease all remaining operations of the Borneo Company.

References

External links
 

Companies established in 1856
Defunct companies of Malaysia
1967 disestablishments in Malaysia
Companies disestablished in 1967